Prince Viggo, Count of Rosenborg (Viggo Christian Adolf Georg; 25 December 1893 – 4 January 1970) was a Danish prince. He was born in Copenhagen the youngest son of Prince Valdemar of Denmark and Princess Marie of Orléans. He was also the youngest grandson of Christian IX of Denmark.

Biography

Prince Viggo was born on 25 December 1893, in the Yellow Palace, an 18th-century town house at 18 Amaliegade, immediately adjacent to the Amalienborg Palace complex in Copenhagen. He was the fourth child of Prince Valdemar of Denmark, and his wife Princess Marie of Orléans. His father was a younger son of King Christian IX of Denmark and Louise of Hesse-Kassel, and his mother was the eldest daughter of Prince Robert, Duke of Chartres and Princess Françoise of Orléans. His parents' marriage was said to be a political match.

Without the legally required permission of the Danish king for a dynastic marriage, Viggo married Eleanor Margaret Green (New York City, 5 November 1895 – Copenhagen, 3 July 1966), in New York City on 10 June 1924.

As became customary in the Danish royal house upon marriage to a commoner, prior to the wedding Viggo renounced his place in Denmark's line of succession to the Crown, forfeiting his title of Prince of Denmark, and his style of Royal Highness. With the king's authorisation, he assumed the title "Prince Viggo, Greve af (Count of) Rosenborg" and the style of Highness on 21 December 1923. Although the comital title was made hereditary for all of his legitimate descendants in the male line, the princely title was restricted to himself and his wife alone (i.e. "Prince and Princess Viggo", etc.). The couple had no children.

Prince Viggo died in Ebeltoft in 1970. He was the last surviving grandson of Christian IX.

Honours
Prince Viggo received the following orders and decorations:

Ancestors

References

Citations

Bibliography

External links

1893 births
1970 deaths
People from Ebeltoft
Danish princes
House of Glücksburg (Denmark)
Counts of Rosenborg
Burials at Roskilde Cathedral
Disinherited European royalty
Recipients of the Cross of Honour of the Order of the Dannebrog
Grand Crosses of the Order of the Dannebrog
Grand Croix of the Légion d'honneur